Butch is a nickname which may refer to:

 Frederick Alan Aikman (1919–1991), Canadian World War II flying ace
 Butch Baird (born 1936), American retired PGA and Senior PGA Tour golfer
 Butch Ballard (1918–2011), American jazz drummer
 Butch Beard (born 1947), American basketball player
 William H. Blanchard (1916–1966), US Air Force four-star general
 Émile Bouchard (1919–2012), Canadian National Hockey League player and member of the Hockey Hall of Fame
 Butch Buchholz (born 1940), American former tennis player
 Mark Butcher (born 1972), English former Test cricketer
 Butch Cassidy ne Robert LeRoy Parker (1866–1908), American outlaw
 Butch Davis (born 1951), American football coach
 Ronald DeFeo, Jr. (1951–2021), American murderer
 Kevin DuBrow (1955–2007), American lead vocalist of the heavy metal band Quiet Riot
 Adrian S. Fisher (1914–1983), American lawyer and public servant
 Butch Goring (born 1949), Canadian National Hockey League player
 William Edward Hanford (1908–1996), American chemist who developed the modern process for making polyurethane
 Butch Harmon (born 1943), American golf instructor and former player
 Sir Arthur Harris, 1st Baronet (1892–1984), Marshal of the Royal Air Force during the  Second World War
 Butch Hartman (born 1965), American animator, writer, director, producer, illustrator and voice actor
 Butch Hartman (racing driver) (1940–1994), American stock car racing national champion
 Bob Heffner (born 1938), American retired Major League Baseball pitcher
 Butch James (born 1979), South African former rugby union player 
 Butch Johnson (American football) (born 1954), former National Football League wide receiver
 John J. Lenzini, Jr. (1947–1996), American Thoroughbred horse trainer
 Butch Levy (1921–1999), American football player and professional wrestler
 Butch Lindley (1948–1990), American NASCAR driver
 Butch Lochner (born 1931), South African former international rugby union player
 Obert Logan (1941–2003), American National Football League player
 Graeme Macdougall (born 1940), Australian former Rugby Union player
 Ed Mierkowicz (born 1924), American former Major League Baseball player
 Butch Miles (1944-2023), American drummer and musician
 Butch Morris (1947–2013), American jazz cornetist, composer and conductor
 Jonathan Norton (born 1958), original drummer for the band Eels
 Edward O'Hare (1914–1943), American pilot during World War II
 Butch Otter (born 1942), politician and current governor of Idaho
 Butch Reynolds (born 1964), American former 400-meter sprinter
 Harry G. Robinson III (born 1942), American architect and professor
 Roy Sanders (National League pitcher) (1892–1950), American Major League Baseball pitcher
 Clyde J. Tate II (born 1957), American major general and army lawyer
 Butch Vig (born 1955), American musician and producer, and drummer for the band Garbage
 Roy Marlin Voris (1919–2005), American World War II flying ace and founder of the Blue Angels flight demonstration squadron
 Bill Walker (Australian footballer, born 1942) (born 1942), New Zealand former Australian rules footballer
 Butch Walker (born 1969), American recording artist, songwriter, and record producer
 Ray Wilkins (born 1956), English former football player
Butch Wynegar (born 1956), American major league baseball player

Lists of people by nickname
English masculine given names